Hamilton Ross (26 August 1849 – 29 March 1938) was an English cricketer who made 20 first-class appearances between 1885 and 1895.  He played twelve first-class matches for the Marylebone Cricket Club (MCC), and also appeared for Middlesex and Somerset.  A right-handed batsman, he occasionally played as wicket-keeper.

Life and career
Born in Grenada, British West Indies, Ross was educated at the Hermitage School, Bath, then became a student in the Middle Temple and later a barrister.  He practised in both London and Bath.

In 1869, while playing for Gentlemen of Sussex against the Players of Sussex, he scored 101 in the second-innings after being promoted from batting at number eleven in the first-innings to opening in the second.  A prolific scorer in club cricket, he hit six centuries in 1871.  On his first-class debut however, Ross made a pair for the Gentlemen.  He played one match for Middlesex in 1876, making 35 & 1 during a draw with Oxford University.

During the late 1870s, Ross played a number of matches for the 'Gentlemen of Somerset', a team of amateurs that were forerunners for Somerset County Cricket Club.

References

External links
 
 

1849 births
1938 deaths
English cricketers
Marylebone Cricket Club cricketers
Middlesex cricketers
Somerset cricketers
Grenadian cricketers
Gentlemen of the South cricketers
Gentlemen cricketers
Wicket-keepers